Trevor Stines (born July 15, 1996) is an American actor, best known for his role as Jason Blossom in Riverdale (20172022).

Filmography

Film

Television

References

External links 

Living people
American male film actors
American male television actors
21st-century American male actors
1996 births